The Sanket Trust is a non-profit trust established in 1992 in Bangalore having playwright Girish Karnad as its Chairman and actor-theatre practitioner Arundhati Nag, as its Managing Trustee, apart from theatre personalities as well as administrative experts on its board of trustees.  It formally administers Ranga Shankara and all its activities. The Trust is advised and guided by theatre activists from all over the country. This informal advisory group meets whenever necessary to review Ranga Shankara activities and share ideas.

Members
The trust comprises 
Girish Karnad, Chairman
Arundhati Nag, Managing Trustee
S Surendranath, Trustee
S Parmeshwarappa, Trustee
B Suresha, Trustee
M S Sriram, Trustee
M.S. Sathyu, Consultant

History
The Sanket Trust was founded in 1992 by a group of theatre lovers, many of whom had worked with Shankar Nag and Arundhati Nag in the Sanket theatre group. Rangashankara was established in 2001 as an initiative of Sanket Trust, for bringing local and international performances to the theatre audiences in Bangalore, at an affordable cost and provide performing space to theatre groups at an affordable rent.

References

External links 
 Sanket Trust
 
 

Non-profit organisations based in India
Theatrical organisations in India
Organisations based in Bangalore
Organizations established in 1992
Kannada theatre
1992 establishments in Karnataka